The men's artistic team all-around event at the 2020 Summer Olympics was held on 26 July 2021 at the Ariake Gymnastics Centre.

After qualifications, where Japan, China, and the ROC were separated by only three tenths of a point, ROC narrowly won the competition by a tenth of a point over host nation Japan in silver medal position. It is ROC's first title since the 1996 Summer Olympics, when they competed as Russia. China repeated their bronze medal finish from the 2016 Summer Olympics.

After the ROC women won the team all-around title the following day, ROC became the first nation to win both the men's and women's team all-around titles at the same Olympics since China did so at the 2008 Summer Olympics.

The medals for the competition were presented by Emma Terho, Finland; IOC Member, and the medalists' bouquets were presented by Morinari Watanabe, Japan; FIG President.

Qualified teams 

To reach the Olympics, a National Olympic Committee had to earn one of 12 team quota places. These were allocated through the 2018 World Artistic Gymnastics Championships (top three teams) and the 2019 World Artistic Gymnastics Championships (top nine teams, excluding those qualified in 2018). Those 12 teams competed in the qualification round in Tokyo on 24 July, with the top eight advancing to the final.

The following teams qualified for the Olympics by achieving a top three placement at the 2018 World Artistic Gymnastics Championships:

 
 
 

The following teams qualified for the event by achieving a top nine placement among non-qualified teams at the 2019 World Artistic Gymnastics Championships:

Schedule

Qualifications 

The top eight teams in qualifications, based on combined scores of each apparatus, advanced to the final. In the final, each team selected three gymnasts to compete on each apparatus. All scores on each apparatus were summed to give a final team score. The scores in qualification did not carry over to the final.

Final

References

Men's artistic team all-around
2020
Men's events at the 2020 Summer Olympics
2021 in gymnastics